ASSETT, Inc. is an American private engineering, research and development consulting firm headquartered in Manassas, Virginia.  ASSETT is an acronym meaning Advanced Systems Supportability Engineering Technologies and Tools.  In 2007, Inc. Magazine ranked ASSETT, Inc.  #45 in its list of the Top 100 Defense Contractors.

History
ASSETT was founded in 2001 by George Dasher, Galen Plunkett, Bob McCaig and Gene Hammel.

In 2007, Inc. Magazine ranked ASSETT, Inc. #45 in Top Companies in Defense Contractors. It also ranked in the top 5000 companies overall for this year.

In 2009, Inc. Magazine ranked ASSETT, Inc. #1,634 out of 5000 and a growth rate of 196.5%.

In 2010, ASSETT, Inc. was awarded by The Virginia Chamber of Commerce Fantastic 50. At this point, the company had grown to over 60 employees.

Robert L. McCaig is the Senior Vice President and Wayne Jakubowski is President.

See also
 List of United States defense contractors

References

External links
 ASSETT, Inc. web site

Defense companies of the United States
Engineering companies of the United States
Consulting firms of the United States
Manassas, Virginia
Consulting firms established in 2001
Technology companies established in 2001
2001 establishments in Virginia